Cristian David Solimeno (born 27 April 1975) is a British actor, writer and director.

Personal life
Solimeno was born in Hammersmith, London, England. He grew up in Paris and is of English and Italian descent via his father Ambrogio.

Career
He has played DC Dick Hall in the fifth and final series of Wycliffe in 1998, Jason Turner in Footballers' Wives, and has also had a number of guest roles in other British television series, and appeared in the 2000 film Dead Babies, 2005 Happy New Year special of The Vicar of Dibley and the 2006 series Strictly Confidential. He was The Guardian in Highlander: The Source. He starred alongside Philip Glenister, John Simm and Ashley Walters is the 2008 film Tu£sday. In the same year he appeared in Perfect Hideout. In 2011, Solimeno wrote and directed a feature film called The Glass Man starring Andy Nyman and James Cosmo. In 2013, he played Jonathan in The Bible TV Mini-Series. In 2013 and 2014, he played Ray McCormick in Hollyoaks, until his character was allegedly killed by Grace Black (Tamara Wall). In 2018 he can be seen as the troubled lead Dexter in British psychological thriller Welcome to Curiosity.

References

External links

1975 births
Living people
People from Hammersmith
Male actors from London
English male film actors
English male television actors
English people of Irish descent
English people of Italian descent
Writers from London
Male actors from Paris
Writers from Paris